Wanops is a monotypic genus of Mexican goblin spiders containing the single species, Wanops coecus. It was first described by Ralph Vary Chamberlin & Vaine Wilton Ivie in 1938, and is only found in Mexico.

See also
 List of Oonopidae species

References

Monotypic Araneomorphae genera
Oonopidae
Spiders of Mexico